Fiji and Indonesia established relations in 1974, at that time Indonesian mission for Fiji was accredited through Indonesian embassy in Wellington, New Zealand. On August 22, 2002 Indonesia opened their embassy in Suva, Fiji. Fiji reciprocated by opening their embassy in Jakarta on April 6, 2011 which is also accredited to East Timor.

Economic relations
Although the trade volume is relatively small with a value of US$36 million in 2007, Indonesia sees Fiji as potential gate to enter South Pacific market. According to Indonesian Center for Statistics, the trade balance was heavily in favour to Indonesia that enjoyed trade surplusses for years. Indonesian export to Fiji sees increasing trends that reached total US$18.63 million in 2006, US$18.74 million in 2007, and US$23.23 million in 2008.

Fijians mainly rely on foreign imports for their daily needs since those are not being produced locally. Fiji mainly traded with Australia and New Zealand, and Indonesia saw this as an opportunity to enter the local market. Indonesian exports to Fiji are mainly daily products such as paper, fiber, textiles, electrical equipments, home appliances and electronics, furniture, gift and craft, fashion products, convenience foods, coffee, shampoo, soap, detergent, plastics, chemicals, automotive and parts, and also agricultural equipments.

Cooperation, education and assistance
Initially the relations between two countries were dominated by trade sector. The two countries, however, have agreed to expand the relations to other sectors, which includes tourism, business and education sectors. Fiji has sent dozens of their students to study in several Indonesian universities. On January 8, 2014, the Indonesia government donated FJ$1 million (US$528,899) for the formation of the proposed Regional Police Academy at Nasova, Suva. The academy which will be based in Fiji will train police officers from the five Melanesian Spearhead Group (MSG) countries.

Notes

External links 
 Embassy of Fiji in Jakarta, Indonesia
 Embassy of Indonesia in Suva, Fiji

Bilateral relations of Indonesia
Indonesia